Daniel James Emerton (born 27 September 1991) is an English semi-professional footballer who plays as a forward or a winger for  Northern Counties East League club North Ferriby F.C.

Career
Born in Beverley, East Riding of Yorkshire, Emerton began his footballing career at Hull City's Academy at the age of 12. He signed his first professional contract in May 2010 after a successful 2009–2010 title winning youth campaign under the guidance of youth team managers Billy Russell and Neil Mann. In April 2011 he joined Division 1 Norra team IK Frej on a one-month loan, making his debut on 25 April, against BK Forward. He returned to Hull after making five appearances.

On 23 November 2012, Emerton was loaned to Alfreton Town. On 24 November 2013 he made his debut for Alfreton Town in the FA Trophy against Kidderminster Harriers and then went on to make two appearances, all from the bench, and returned to Hull in January 2013. Emerton was released from Hull at the end of 2012–13 season having spent three seasons with the club.

On 1 August, Emerton signed a one-year deal with Northampton Town. Two days later, he made his professional debut, in a 0–1 away defeat against York City. He scored his first goal for the club in a 2–1 win over Bishop's Stortford in a televised FA Cup first round match on 10 November 2013. On 4 March 2014, Emerton had his contract at Northampton Town terminated after Chris Wilder became the permanent manager after the sacking of Aidy Boothroyd.

On 7 March, he signed for Conference North club North Ferriby United, scoring on his debut against Histon on 8 March. He made 12 appearances in the closing stage of the season and played in both legs of the play-off semi-final against Guiseley, which North Ferriby lost 3–0 on aggregate.

In 2019, following the winding up of North Ferriby United, he joined phoenix club North Ferriby.

Career statistics

References

External links

1991 births
Living people
Sportspeople from Beverley
Footballers from the East Riding of Yorkshire
English footballers
English expatriate footballers
Association football wingers
Association football forwards
Hull City A.F.C. players
IK Frej players
Alfreton Town F.C. players
Northampton Town F.C. players
North Ferriby United A.F.C. players
Ettan Fotboll players
National League (English football) players
English Football League players
Expatriate footballers in Sweden
English expatriate sportspeople in Sweden